Fandy Fan Shao-hsun (born November 4, 1993) is a Taiwanese actor and model. Some of his most notable works include Crossing the Line, a popular boys' love drama, and We Are Champions, a film.

Career
Fan debuted in 2012, starring in the series As the Bell Rings. In 2019, he won the 56th Best New Performer, for his performance in We Are Champions.

Filmography

Film

Television series

Variety and reality show

References

External links
  

1993 births
Living people
Taiwanese male television actors
Taiwanese male film actors
21st-century Taiwanese male actors